University City or university city may refer to a town/city specialized in providing higher education where its colleges and universities have a disproportionately large weight on its economic, social and cultural landscape, also known as college town, or a neighborhood within a town/city with the same characteristics. Examples of these include:

Places

Americas

Brazil
Cidade Universitária, a neighborhood in the North Zone of Rio de Janeiro, Brazil, on the artificial island of Fundão Island.

Colombia 
 University City of Bogotá (Ciudad Universitaria), a university in Bogotá, Colombia

Mexico
 Ciudad Universitaria, the main campus of the National Autonomous University of Mexico

United States
 University City, Missouri
 University City (Charlotte neighborhood)
 University City, Philadelphia, easternmost region of West Philadelphia
University City (SEPTA station), a train station in University City, Philadelphia
 University City, Pittsburgh
 University City, San Diego, northwestern portion of the city next to the University of California

Other places 
 University City of Sharjah, an education district in Sharjah, United Arab Emirates
 University City of Madrid, complex in the Moncloa-Aravaca district of Madrid, Spain

See also

City University (disambiguation)
College town